The 2013–14 Army Black Knights men's basketball team represented the United States Military Academy during the 2013–14 NCAA Division I men's basketball season. The Black Knights, led by fifth year head coach Zach Spiker, played their home games at Christl Arena and were members of the Patriot League. They finished the season 15–16, 10–8 in Patriot League play to finish in fifth place. They advanced to the semifinals of the Patriot League tournament where they lost to Boston University.

Roster

Schedule

|-
!colspan=9 style="background:#000000; color:#D6C499;"| Regular season

|-
!colspan=9 style="background:#000000; color:#D6C499;"| 2014 Patriot League tournament

References

Army Black Knights men's basketball seasons
Army
Army Black Knights men's basketball
Army Black Knights men's basketball